Bolitobius is a genus of beetles belonging to the family Staphylinidae.

The genus was first described by Leach in 1819.

The species of this genus are found in Eurasia and Northern America.

Species:
 Bolitobius castaneus
 Bolitobius cingulatus
 Bolitobius formosus

References

Tachyporinae
Staphylinidae genera